E450 or E-450 may refer to:
 E450 (food additive)
 E-450, a Ford E-Series van or minibus
 E450, a model variant of the 5th generation Mercedes E-Class
 E-450, in the List of AMD processors with 3D graphics
 Olympus E-450, a camera
 E450 series, a Sony Walkman digital audio player

See also
 Sun Enterprise 450, a Sun Enterprise server computer
 Canon EOS 450D, a camera